Sultan Dimasangcay Adel (alternative spelling Dimasangkay Adil, reigning 1578-1585) was the fourth sultan of Maguindanao in the Philippines. He was a direct descendant of Sharif Kabungsuwan, the first sultan of Maguindanao. He was the son of Sultan Bangkaya with his Maguindanao wife. Dimasangcay also had half brothers, Gugu Sarikula and Buisan, who also sequentially reigned as sultans of Maguindanao after him.

Dimasangcay was married to Imbog, a Sulu woman, and they had a daughter named Paguian Goan. The daughter later married a Basilan chief of Bornean descent, Adasaolan.

See also 
 Sultanate of Maguindanao
 Gugu Sarikula

References 

Filipino datus, rajas and sultans
Filipino Muslims
People of Spanish colonial Philippines
Filipino nobility